Clio Goldsmith (born 16 June 1957) is a French former actress, appearing mostly as a femme fatale in some films of the early 1980s. She is a member of the prominent Goldsmith family through her father ecologist Edward Goldsmith. Goldsmith was married to British travel writer Mark Shand.

Life and career
She began acting in the 1980 movie The Cricket of Alberto Lattuada. Alongside Virna Lisi and Anthony Franciosa, she played a fun-loving girl ending up as prostitute. In 1981, she played prostitute Clemence in Mauro Bolognini's The Lady of the Camellias together with Isabelle Huppert. In Plein sud, she vows she will take up with the first fool she sees, seducing Patrick Dewaere.

In 1982, the title role in the comedy Bankers Also Have Souls earned her some international fame. The Michel Lang movie which was produced by her cousin Gilbert de Goldschmidt featured Pierre Mondy and Claudia Cardinale. Goldsmith plays a beautiful call girl, a gift to a retiring banker from his colleagues. After two other roles, and having appeared twice in an Italian adult entertainment magazine Playmen, she retired from acting.

From  1982 to 1985 she was married to Italian entrepreneur Carlo Alessandro Puri Negri (*1952), an heir of the Pirelli family. They had a daughter, Talita. In 1990 she married British author Mark Shand, brother of Camilla, Queen Consort and they had a daughter, Ayesha. Shand confirmed in 2010 that the couple were divorced.

Filmography
 1980: The Cricket (La cicala)
 1980: The Lady of the Camellias
 1981: Honey (Miele di donna)
 1981:  (Plein sud)
 1981: La caduta degli angeli ribelli
 1982: Miss Right (La donna giusta)
 1982: 
 1982: Bankers Also Have Souls (Le cadeau)
 1984:  (TV miniseries)
 1986: Tug of Love (L'étincelle )

References

External links
 
 Allmovie entry (with covers depicting her)
 Entries in German movie databases: , 

1957 births
Living people
Actresses from Paris
French film actresses
French television actresses
French people of German-Jewish descent
20th-century French actresses
Clio
Clio